The 1993 Stanford Cardinal football team represented Stanford University in the 1993 NCAA Division I-A football season. The Cardinal played in the Pacific-10 Conference.

Schedule

Roster

References

Stanford
Stanford Cardinal football seasons
Stanford Cardinal football